Antonio Socías Olmos (born Valencia, 12 July 1970) is a  Spanish rugby union player. He plays as a wing. 
He is the younger brother of Alberto Socías, who also was a Spanish international.

Career
His first international cap was during a match against Germany at Heidelberg, on April 26, 1998. He was part of the 1999 Rugby World Cup roster. His last international cap was during a match against Australia, at Madrid, on November 1, 2001.

External links
Antonio Socías International Statistics

1970 births
Living people
Sportspeople from Valencia
Spanish rugby union players
Rugby union wings
Spain international rugby union players